Buenaventura Carlos Aribau (1798–1862) was a Spanish economist, stenographer, writer and politician who wrote in Spanish, Catalan, Latin, and Italian.

Works
Poetic Essays (1817)
Libertad, libertad sacrosanct, revolutionary anthem (1820)
The freedom restored, collaboration with other authors (1820)
In Ms. Leticia Cortesi (1821)
The Homeland (1833)
Sicacnger All'eximia artist Manuela Oreiro Lemma Vega, che nella Dimora home adjoining quella dell'autore (1840)
The Virgen of Dolores (1845)
In Ms. Maria Dolores Belza

References 

Renaixença writers
1798 births
1862 deaths
Place of birth missing
Spanish politicians
Spanish economists